Abishabis or Small Eyes (died August 30, 1843) was a Cree religious leader. He became the prophet of a religious movement that spread among the Cree communities of northern Manitoba and Ontario during the 1840s. His preaching caused some Cree people to stop hunting furs, angering employees of the Hudson's Bay Company (HBC) and reducing the company's profits. After losing much of his influence in 1843, Abishabis was suspected of murdering a First Nations family living near York Factory. He was arrested and imprisoned at Fort Severn, where a group of Cree forcibly removed him from his jail cell, murdered him, and burned his body. His followers slowly disavowed his teachings and destroyed their relics from the movement or practiced their religion in secret. 

The religious philosophy of his teachings was an admixture of Christianity and Cree beliefs. Abishabis preached that he had visited heaven and that followers could use a Cree writing system to create religious relics, the purpose of which is disputed among academics. His followers did not worship him as a deity but believed his teachings were a revelation from their god. Stories of Abishabis were passed down by the Cree people, who claimed that Abishabis introduced Christianity to them.

Early life and background

Abishabis was from a district that contained York Factory. He was Cree, a member of a group referred to as "Home Guard Indians" by Hudson's Bay Company (HBC). The group that he belonged to were frequent traders with HBC, and relied upon guns to hunt. In the years preceding Abishabis's religious pursuits, the group believed something was wrong with their hunting grounds, as they struggled to hunt caribou. James Hargrave, an officer with HBC, noted that there was nothing remarkable about Abishabis before the arrival of Methodist missionaries to the area.

Religious activity

Religious activity associated with Abishabis was first recorded in 1842. In late 1842 and early 1843, his movement spread to the Cree in the area between Fort Churchhill (in what is now Manitoba) and Moose River (in what is now Ontario). His movement would later be known as "Track to Heaven". Abishabis's preaching divided the Cree people. His followers expected Abishabis to provide gifts that equaled the resources that were provided by Methodist missionaries and HBC. Meanwhile, colonists and businessmen from Europe were concerned about Abishabis's preaching, as his followers were less likely to hunt for furs, hurting their profits. They also reported that followers relied upon wooden carvings for salvation and consequently starved to death. HBC and the Methodist missionaries were united in refusing to recognise Abishabis's authority amongst his group.

Abishabis's influence decreased in mid-1843, partially because employees of HBC advocated against his movement. One day after prayers, Abishabis approached Hargrave to shake his hand, which would signal support from HBC towards Abishabis and his group. Hargrave refused, indicating to the Cree people that Abishabis could not provide resources from the company. Support further weakened when Abishabis asked for his followers' wives as a form of tithing, and Abishabis's claims of receiving food and clothing in exchange for the faith of his followers went unfulfilled. Hargrave reported that by July 1843, Abishabis was begging for food and supplies in order to survive. Abishabis's missionaries, including an unnamed woman and boy, were reported by employees of HBC to be spreading Abishabis's teachings. In response, HBC employees spread a rumour that Abishabis was a windigo, a spirit that would eat people. Many of his wives returned to their families after Abishabis struggled to provide them with resources.

Arrest and death
In July 1843, Abishabis gathered supplies to travel to Severn House. Abishabis was accused of murdering a family in the York Factory area and taking some of their possessions. Researcher Norman James Williamson stated that it was difficult to corroborate this story, as this version of events was reported to HBC by the Cree and elaborated upon by Hargrave's wife, Letitia. Abishabis arrived in Severn several days after the murder and spent a couple of days there, bothering the population and refusing to leave despite harassment from the people. Hargrave sent an interpreter named John Cromartie to Severn with orders to incite the Cree population to kill Abishabis by accusing him of being a windigo. Hargrave gave this order to prevent an uprising of the Cree people against HBC. 

Indigenous people approached Cromartie upon his arrival in Severn House, claiming that Abishabis was threatening them if they did not give him resources. Cromartie disobeyed Hargrave's orders and arrested Abishabis on August 9; Norman Williamson attributes this to Cromartie's anxiety about the situation and the possibility of not having enough food for the upcoming winter. In his account, Cromartie claimed to have questioned Abishabis about the murders in York Factory, but Abishabis did not respond. Cromartie allowed Abishabis to escape, believing he would leave the area. Abishabis did leave for a time, but he returned shortly afterwards and was arrested again on August 28. On August 30, three men took him from his cell and hit his head with an axe, destroying his brain. Letitia, in a letter to her mother, reported that the man who struck the final blow was named Towers. The men brought Abishabis's body to a nearby island and burned it, declaring that he might have been a windigo and that they wanted to prevent him from haunting them.

Religious views

It is difficult to establish Abishabis's religious beliefs before his religious preaching because the Cree were not forthcoming about their beliefs when speaking to Europeans. The ultimate goal in the Cree religion was to journey to the afterlife, located in the remote west. This differed from the Christian concept of heaven as a place in the sky for morally good people, and thus the Cree struggled to understand the Christian concept when explained to them by missionaries. Abishabis's group was probably monotheistic, believing in a self-existing creator of the world. Their deity was distant from the group and difficult to approach. Methodists described Jesus to the Cree as an intermediary between humans and God, allowing humans to make requests to their deity. Abishabis used the Methodist teachings as a foundation for the Cree to communicate with their own deity. Abishabis encouraged his followers to observe the Sabbath, sing psalms, and paint books.

Before beginning his ministry, Abishabis separated himself from the group. Upon his return, he stated that he traveled to the sky and received blessings and information, including the deity's physical features. Using a syllabic writing system, introduced to the Cree people by Methodist missionary James Evans, Abishabis and his associates created texts, charts, and pictographs. These were created with lines drawn upon wood or paper. Academics have given various explanations for what these lines depicted. Lee Irwin wrote that they were seen as paths to heaven and hell while Philip H. Round said they were used to determine the will of spirits, allowing the Cree to purify themselves. Norman Williamson wrote that the role of Abishabis's revelations was to determine possible futures for the Cree people, while Timothy E. Williamson said the writings included warnings against adopting European customs and promises of game on Earth and rewards in heaven for following these teachings. Abishabis taught his followers his technique so that they could create their own paths. He also claimed to have received a book from God called "Tracks to Heaven".

Some sources state that Abishabis referred to himself as Jesus. Norman Williamson states that this was probably rhetoric from the Methodists, and that instead Abishabis claimed that Jesus led his spiritual journey. Abishabis's followers did not deify him and considered his teachings to be revelations of God's will. They believed that the spirits called upon the Cree to recognise Abishabis as a prophet, replace the Methodist missionaries' books with religious texts created by Abishabis and his associates, and return to their pre-colonisation customs. Abishabis claimed that he was the "High Priest of the Tribe" and demanded that his followers give him clothing and weapons. Norman Williamson stated that Abishabis's ministry was successful because he was the first person to declare himself a Christian leader among his Cree community. This allowed them to open themselves up to the possibility of a Cree person leading their Christian theological teachings. Round said that Abishabis's success stemmed from merging Christian ideas with the familiarity of the Cree writing system, which promised Cree empowerment.

Legacy
Upon Abishabis's death, Abishabis's followers were persecuted by HBC and the Methodist church. A woman and boy spread Abishabis's teachings to the Albany Cree community; upon their discovery by the Methodists, they were forced to put their relics of Abishabis's teachings into a bonfire that was attended by Cree people and HBC employees. 

Hargrave sent a report to the British government in London, which praised Hargrave's efforts to have Abishabis killed. In February 1844, a Methodist missionary named George Barnley reported that the Cree people in Moose Factory were still under the influence of Abishabis's teachings, which had also spread to Cree people in Eastmain. Abishabis's followers began to conceal their faith when the influence of HBC increased and as its workers showed disapproval of this interpretation of Christianity. Other followers slowly disavowed Abishabis's teachings and destroyed materials that were inspired by him.

In 1930, anthropologist John Montgomery Cooper reported that Cree people in Moose Factory had passed down oral stories about the movement. The Cree stated that Abishabis had introduced Christianity to them.

Notes

References

Citations

Works cited

1843 deaths
Canadian religious leaders
Cree people
Indigenous leaders in Manitoba
Year of birth unknown
Canadian animists
Religious figures of the indigenous peoples of North America